Raymond Eugene Brown (January 11, 1946 – 2008) was an American serial killer and rapist who killed his live-in girlfriend and her daughter in 1987, shortly after being paroled for the triple murder of three relatives in 1960, when he was 14. He was sentenced to death for the latter murders, and died on death row in 2008.

Biography 
Raymond Eugene Brown was born on January 11, 1946, in Ashland, Alabama, one of four boys born to Marvin and Emma Lou Brown. According to relatives and friends, he had a normal upbringing and happy childhood, regularly visited church and did not exhibit any worrying behavior. Brown attended the Clay County High School in his hometown, where he played for the junior varsity football team. He excelled in sports and was considered popular at school, with most acquaintances describing him in a positive manner.

Triple murder
On the late evening of October 1, 1960, Brown broke into a home occupied by three relatives (31-year-old aunt Berta Mae Martin; 63-year-old grandmother Ethel Ogle and 82-year-old disabled great-grandmother Everlena Ogle) via an unlocked back door, with the aim of stealing money to buy himself some cleats. While searching the house, he came across his aunt, who had awoken to investigate the noise coming from the kitchen. Upon being found out, Brown assaulted Martin and stabbed her a total of 123 times with a kitchen knife.

After this, in order to eliminate potential witnesses, he entered the rooms of his grandmother and great-grandmother and stabbed both multiple times until he was sure they were dead. He then performed multiple post-mortem manipulations on the bodies, which included slashing their throats from ear to ear. The bodies were discovered in the early morning by Brown's mother, who immediately called the police. While investigating the crime scene, officers discovered multiple bloody heel prints that they believed belonged to the teenager. In order to determine whether he was responsible, they interviewed a number of his classmates, friends and acquaintances, some of whom claimed that Brown had told them he intended to visit his aunt and had supposedly gone there after finishing with soccer practice. Because of this, he was detained five days later in the school gymnasium and taken to the local police station for questioning. Brown subsequently confessed to the crimes, and recounted the circumstances and details of how he had done it. His fingerprints were also matched to those found at the crime scene.

A few days after the crime, souvenir hunters attempted to break into the house and steal whatever they could - according to authorities, there were more than 600 cars from 18 counties around the state and even more from nine other states. An elderly neighbor tasked with guarding the house, 64-year-old J. W. Hester, was overwhelmed by the mob and shoved aside, forcing him to call the authorities and disperse the crowd. In order to prevent another such occurrence, officers were put on guard duty at the house.

Prosecution, sentence, and release 
At the time, Alabama's criminal code allowed defendants to be prosecuted as adults, and on October 10, the Clay County Prosecutor's Office and the District Attorney held a meeting to decide on how they would proceed. Brown's attorney petitioned that his client be tried in juvenile court, while prosecutors demanded that he be tried as an adult, which would have made him eligible for the death penalty. 

Eventually, they settled on trying him as an adult and ordered that he undergo a psychiatric evaluation at the Bryce Hospital in Tuscaloosa. A few months later, he was deemed sane to stand trial. At trial, the court was packed with curious onlookers interested in the events, while Brown himself spent most of the time seemingly emotionless and occasionally covering his face with his hands.

Due to the overwhelming amount of evidence against him, including witness testimony, material evidence and his own admissions, Brown was swiftly convicted. However, instead of a death sentence, he was given three life terms without parole and transferred to a local prison. He expressed no visible emotion during the sentencing phase.

During his incarceration, Brown studied to become an auto-mechanic and participated in a number of prisoner rehabilitation programs, for which he earned a reputation as a model prisoner. Due to this, he was paroled in 1973 and returned to Ashland, where he lived at his mother's house for some time. Soon after, Brown moved to Montgomery, where he found work at a local autoshop and rented himself an apartment.

Sexual assault, incarceration, and release 
In the late 1970s, Brown developed an addiction to alcohol which greatly affected his lifestyle. While intoxicated, he would go out and sexually harass women and girls around the area. In 1980, he raped his apartment manager and attempted to strangle her, making her fall into unconsciousness. Believing that she was dead, Brown left the scene. When the woman came back to her senses, she contacted the authorities, who apprehended Brown not long after. As he had broken the conditions of his parole, he was returned to prison, where he remained for the next six years before being granted parole again in June 1986. Upon his release, he returned to Montgomery and found himself another job at another autoshop.

Association with Linda LeMonte and subsequent killings 
Sometime in late 1986, Brown became acquainted with 31-year-old Linda LeMonte, a single mother with two children. The pair soon became intimate, with Brown moving into her apartment in early summer 1987. During this time, he reportedly ceased all aggressive behavior and was considered an upstanding citizen by friends and relatives alike.

On the evening of August 9, 1987, Brown attacked LeMonte at their shared apartment, stabbing her multiple times in the vagina, rectum and chest before making a 23 cm-long incision on her throat. He then sliced open her abdomen, making a 69 cm-long incision spanning from the lower neck down to the right side of her pubis. After this, he went into the bedroom of her daughter, 10-year-old Sheila Smoke, where he proceeded to rape and then stab her multiple times in the chest, throat and abdomen, leaving the murder weapon inside her body. LeMonte's 6-year-old son Aaron, who was in the house at the time, was not harmed.

After he was finished, Brown took a picture of LeMonte's corpse with a Polaroid camera and attached the photograph to the TV screen in the room, before scattering playing cards around the bodies and leaving a piece of paper with his victims' names and the word "me" written on them. After LeMonte failed to show up at work and her children at school, her parents went to her house, where they found the bodies and Aaron. During the preliminary investigation police interviewed LeMonte's ex-husband, David, who told them that Brown was at the house when he brought Aaron over. On the basis of his testimony, in addition to evidence recovered from the crime scene that pointed towards his guilt, Brown was put on a wanted list.

Arrest 
After issuing an arrest warrant, police determined that prior to the discovery of the bodies, Brown had been involved in a traffic accident in Wallsboro, Elmore County. When traffic police arrived at the scene, he gave them his driver's license and described what had happened, declining medical attention. He then retrieved a bag of groceries and a fishing rod from the trunk of the car and proceeded to the nearby lake, after which his car was towed to the parking lot.

On August 12, the Montgomery County Sheriff's Department, in conjunction with several other law enforcement agencies, began a massive search operation to capture Brown. During the search, police focused their search in a sparsely populated, heavily wooded area on the east side of Jordan Lake, about 25 kilometers north of Montgomery, from where about 140 vacationers were evacuated. Brown was arrested that same afternoon, after he walked out of the woods to a service station where he bought cigarettes and a soft drink. The clerk serving him and the gas station employees paid attention to his unkempt appearance, at which point they contacted police. He did not resist his arrest, and after examining his clothing and the interior of his car, authorities found drops of blood. A forensic examination later determined that the blood type of the stains matched that of LeMonte.

Trial 
At his trial, Brown pleaded not guilty to the murders, claiming that he had amnesia and could not remember what had happened on the night of August 9. In order to determine if he was being truthful, he was ordered to undergo a psychiatric evaluation, which determined that he had an "organic personality disorder", but was otherwise sane. On the basis of this and the evidence incriminating him in the murders, Brown was found guilty on all counts and sentenced to death on May 13, 1988. After his conviction, he was transferred to the Holman Correctional Facility's death row to await execution.

Appeals and status 
Over the next few years, Brown and his attorneys filed a number of appeals in an effort to delay the execution date and to have the sentence overturned. In 1990, he appealed on the grounds that his initial trial had several procedural errors, insisting that there were irregularities in the jury selection process. Because of the pre-trial publicity and the public outcry that the case generated, 42 of the 66 potential jurors replied that they were aware to some extent of the crimes. This, according to Brown, biased them against him. In order to back this up, Brown provided the court with 53 newspaper articles describing the murders and his past criminal record.

His appeal was eventually granted and his sentence was overturned. However, the Montgomery County Prosecutor's Office cross-appealed to the Supreme Court, which subsequently reversed the appellate court's decision and affirming the death sentence. The appellate court later reinstated the decision and sent the case for further review.

At the follow-up trial, Brown was found guilty on all counts again and was resentenced to death. In 1995, his attorneys filed another appeal, claiming that the court failed to provide compelling reasons on why it denied potential jurors and it was a sign of social and racial bias. Upon reviewing the appeal, the Circuit Court determined that there was no factual evidence to these claims and promptly dismissed the claims. Brown later attempted to appeal to the Supreme Court of Alabama, which upheld the appellate court's ruling.

In the late 1990s, Brown's attorneys filed yet another appeal, this time arguing that their client had been denied the constitutional right to participate in the jury selection process. They also claimed to have found other irregularities, including that one juror had provided false information. The appellate court ruled against this, finding that there was no factual basis for these claims and that it ultimately did not affect Brown's own guilt of the crimes. All of his subsequent appeals, ranging from ineffective counsel to the death penalty being cruel and unusual punishment, were also dismissed.

Brown died on death row in 2008.

See also 
 Capital punishment in Alabama
 List of serial killers in the United States
 List of youngest killers

References

Bibliography

External links
 Brown v. State (1990)
 Brown v. State (1992)
 Brown v. State (1995)
 Brown v. State (1996)
 Brown v. State (1999)

1946 births
2008 deaths
20th-century American criminals
American criminals
American murderers of children
American people convicted of murder
American people convicted of rape
American prisoners sentenced to death
American prisoners sentenced to life imprisonment
American rapists
American serial killers
Criminals from Alabama
Male serial killers
Murder committed by minors
People convicted of murder by Alabama
People from Ashland, Alabama
Prisoners sentenced to death by Alabama
Prisoners sentenced to life imprisonment by Alabama
Serial killers who died in prison custody
Violence against women in the United States
Prisoners who died in Alabama detention